Břežany is a municipality and village in Rakovník District in the Central Bohemian Region of the Czech Republic. It has about 100 inhabitants.

Etymology
The name is derived from the Czech word břeh, which today means "bank", but in Old Czech it meant "slope".

Geography
It lies in the Plasy Uplands.

History
The first written mention of Břežany is from 1414.

Sights
The landmark of Břežany is the Church of Saint Margaret. The original building was completely destroyed during the Hussite Wars, restored after 1560, and then again destroyed during the Thirty Years' Wars. The current church was built in the Baroque style in 1727.

The second valuable building in a Břežany is Baroque granary. It dates from 1797.

References

External links

Villages in Rakovník District